Zamba is the supreme creator figure of the Yaoundé people of the Cameroons. According to the Yaoundé people, he made the Earth and all its creatures except human beings. He left that job to his four sons: Ngi (gorilla) the strong, N'Kokon (mantis) the wise, Otukut (lizard) the fool, and Wo (chimpanzee) the curious. Each made human beings in his own image, which is why humans are the way they are.

References
McLeish, K. (1996) Myths And Legends Of the World, The Complete Companion To All Traditions, Blaze, United Kingdom.

African gods
Creator gods